= Nordic harp =

Norwegian variant of the classical harp

The Nordic harp (Norwegian: bondeharpe, bygdeharpe, folkeharpe, trekantharpe) is the Norwegian variant of the classical harp (Norwegian: byharper). The Nordic harp had fallen from use in Norway by 1823, but has since been rediscovered.

== Players ==
- Erik Ask-Upmark (sv:Erik Ask-Upmark (in Swedish))
- Beth A. Kollé www.bethkolle.com
- Harper Tasche
- Aryeh Frankfurter
- Sue Richards
